William Clifton may refer to:

Bill Clifton (born 1931), American musician
Sir William Clifton, 3rd Baronet (1653–1686)
William Clifton (Australian politician), Members of the Western Australian Legislative Council, 1832–1870
William Clifton (Canadian politician), in Toronto municipal election, 1946 and 1947
William Clifton (architect), architect of the IOOF Temple Building
William Clifton (footballer) (1891–1953), English footballer, played for Leyland, Preston North End and Rochdale
William de Clifton (fl. 1302-1305), MP for Lancashire

See also
 William Cliffton, Philadelphian poet and pamphleteer
 Clifton (surname)